Tilikum Place is a small plaza in the Belltown neighborhood of downtown Seattle, Washington.

Location and history

This land is indigenous to the Duwamish People. The site once marked the junction of the land claims of Arthur Denny, William Nathaniel Bell, and Carson Boren. The triangular plaza lies at the intersection of 5th Avenue, Cedar Street, and Denny Way.

Tilikum Place has several tables and benches for public use. Lighting was installed in 2008.

The 5 Point Cafe faces Tilikum Place. A notable feature of the square is the life-size statue of Chief Seattle by local sculptor James Wehn.

References

Belltown, Seattle
Parks in Seattle